Abegweit may refer to:

 Abegweit, the name used by the Mi'kmaq Nation to refer to Prince Edward Island, Canada. This is often translated as "Cradled on the Waves"
 Abegweit First Nation, a Mi'kmaq First Nation community in Prince Edward Island
 MV Abegweit (1947) - the name of an icebreaking ferry which operated across the Northumberland Strait between Prince Edward Island and New Brunswick
 MV Abegweit (1982) - the name of an icebreaking ferry which operated across the Northumberland Strait between Prince Edward Island and New Brunswick
 Abegweit Passage, the narrowest part of the Northumberland Strait